You Don't Nomi is a 2019 American documentary film that details the history of the 1995 erotic drama film Showgirls. The documentary is directed by Jeffrey McHale and it features the original cast of the film (in archive footage). It premiered on 27 April 2019 at the Tribeca Film Festival, and upon release it was met with positive feedback from the critics. The film was nominated for Ad Hoc Docs Competition category at the Cleveland International Film Festival.

Cast 

 Adam Nayman
 April Kidwell
 Barbara Shulgasser
 David Schmader
 Haley Mlotek
 Jeff Conaway
 Jeffrey Sconce
 Matt Baume
 Peaches Christ
 Susan Wloszczyna

Release 
On 27 April 2019, You Don't Nomi made its world premiere at the Tribeca Film Festival. It was later screened at the Frameline Film Festival on 27 June 2019, and at the Outfest on 27 July 2019. The film was released in the United States on digital download and DVD on 21 July 2020 by RLJ Entertainment.

Critical response 
The website's critical consensus reads, "It may not change many minds regarding Showgirls, but You Don't Nomi is a solidly entertaining postmortem of an infamous flop." Metacritic, which uses a weighted average, assigned the film a score of 66 out of 100, based on 17 critics, indicating "generally favorable reviews".

Peter Bradshaw writing for The Guardian said that "this documentary completely nails the movie's [Showgirls] attraction". Owen Gleiberman of Variety wrote "You Don't Nomi takes "Showgirls" seriously, obsessively, looking at it from every angle, presenting a chorus of critical voices who analyze the film in ways that are highly enlightening and provocative". David Rooney of The Hollywood Reporter penned that the film is a "Sweet redemption, whether you like it or not". Peter Travers of Rolling Stone wrote, "You Don't Nomi takes many shots at Hollywood hypocrisy, but scores its most cutting points when it shows instead of tells". Glenn Kenny of RogerEbert.com wrote, "The critical rehabilitation of Paul Verhoeven's 1995 "Showgirls" continues apace with "You Don't Nomi," a documentary that wants to appear inventive but too often comes off as affected". KC Ifeanyi of Fast Company wrote that "You Don't Nomi is thoughtfully constructed cine-essay on how Showgirls evolved into the cult classic we know it as today".

Awards and nominations

References

External links 
 
 
 
 

2019 documentary films
2010s English-language films